Marayan (also spelled Mir'ian) is a village in northwestern Syria, administratively part of the Ariha District of the Idlib Governorate. According to the Syria Central Bureau of Statistics, Marayan had a population of 2,274 in the 2004 census. Its inhabitants are predominantly Sunni Muslims. Nearby localities include Ihsim and Iblin to the south, Sarjah to the east, and al-Rami and Ariha to the north.

In the 1960s, Marayan was a small village containing a mosque and a spring. In the village's immediate vicinity are the ruins of Byzantine-era grottoes, which were being used as underground residences in the 1960s.

References

Bibliography

Populated places in Ariha District